Inside George Webley is a British comedy television series which originally aired on ITV in two series between 1968 and 1970. It starred Roy Kinnear as a bank clerk and a compulsive worrier and Patsy Rowlands as Rosemary his long-suffering wife.

Cast

Main
 Roy Kinnear as  George Webley
 Patsy Rowlands as  Rosemary Webley

Guest
 Les Dawson as Mr. Marigold
 Roy Hudd as Simon 
 Hattie Jacques as Mavis Butterfield
 Dandy Nichols as Mrs. Duggins
 Graham Stark as Smelly
 Max Wall as  Mr. Garrick
 James Bolam as  Policeman
 Peter Butterworth as  Dr. Horniman
 J. G. Devlin as Irishman
 Clive Dunn as Ticket collector
 Gorden Kaye as Clerk
 Frank Thornton as Maitre d'
 Marjorie Rhodes as Dirty Dora

References

Bibliography
 Newcomb, Horace . Encyclopedia of Television. Routledge, 2014.

External links
 

1968 British television series debuts
1970 British television series endings
1960s British comedy television series
1970s British comedy television series
ITV sitcoms
English-language television shows
Television series by Yorkshire Television